Anthony Anaxagorou is a British-born Cypriot poet, writer, publisher and educator. His published work includes several volumes of poetry, non-fiction and a collection of short stories. His second poetry collection, After the Formalities (Penned in the Margins) was shortlisted for the T.S. Eliot Prize 2019. In 2020 he published How To...Write It with Merky Books (a Penguin Books imprint curated by Stormzy).

Early life
Anthony Anaxagorou is of Cypriot origin. His mother is from Nicosia and his father from Famagusta.  He grew up in North London and attended Queen Elizabeth's School, Barnet.

Career
In 2002, Anaxagorou won the inaugural Mayor of London's Respect Poetry Slam (now known as SLAMbassadors UK, the national youth slam championship). In 2003, he appeared alongside fellow poet Kae Tempest on Young Nation, presented by Richard Blackwood, where he performed a number of poems themed around social issues relating to young people. After an extended break from poetry, Anaxagorou began self-publishing in 2008. In 2010 he toured the UK supporting MOBO-winning artist Akala on the DoubleThink tour.

In 2012 Anaxagorou founded Out-Spoken, a monthly poetry and live music night, where he remains Artistic Director. In 2019 Out-Spoken started a long-term residency at London's Southbank Centre. In 2015 he founded Out-Spoken Press, an independent publisher of poetry and critical writing, which has published titles from authors including Raymond Antrobus, Sabrina Mahfouz, Fran Lock and Richard Georges.   

In 2015 he was awarded the 2015 Groucho Maverick Award for his poetry and fiction.   

His second poetry collection, After the Formalities (Penned in the Margins, 2019) was shortlisted for the T.S. Eliot Prize 2019. It was a Poetry Book Society Recommendation and was a Guardian poetry book of the year. In 2019 he was made an honorary lecturer of the University of Roehampton. 

In 2020 he published How To... Write It with Merky Books; a practical guide combining writing advice, craft and memoir.

Literary works

 A Difficult Place To Be Human – 2012
 The Blink That Killed The Eye (Jacaranda, 2014)
 It Will Come To You EP - 2013
 Heterogeneous: New and Selected Poems (Out-Spoken Press, 2016)
 After the Formalities (Penned in the Margins, 2019)
 How To... Write It (Merky Books, 2020)

References

External links
Author's website

1983 births
Living people
Writers from London
English male poets
English people of Greek Cypriot descent